Renata is a feminine given name of Latin origin. See Renatus. 

In Francophone countries there is a cognate name Renée.

The following people named Renata have articles in Wikipedia:

 Renata Adler (born 1938), American author, journalist and film critic
 Renata Alt (born 1965), Slovenian born German politician
 Renata Fast (born 1994), Canadian hockey player
 Renáta Fučíková (born 1964), Czech book illustrator, artist and author of children's books
Renata Jaworska (born 1979), Polish artist
 Renata Kallosh (born 1943), Ukrainian-American theoretical physicist
 Renata Salecl (born 1962), Slovene philosopher, sociologist and legal theorist
 Renata Scotto (born 1934), Italian soprano and opera director
 Renata Tebaldi (1922-2004), Italian soprano
 Renata Voráčová (born 1983), Czech tennis player

Italian feminine given names
Croatian feminine given names
Czech feminine given names
Hungarian feminine given names      
Polish feminine given names 
Slovene feminine given names